Jasmine Ying Thompson (born 8 November 2000) is an English singer. She began her career at the age of ten by filming herself singing and uploading the videos to YouTube. In 2014, she was featured on German deep house producer Robin Schulz's song "Sun Goes Down", which charted within the top 10 in multiple countries including Australia, Germany, Austria, and Switzerland. As of March 2019, her YouTube channel has amassed over 3.3 million subscribers and over 570 million views.

Her acoustic cover version of Chaka Khan's original "Ain't Nobody" reached number 32 on the UK Singles Chart in 2013; this success led to the song being featured in an advertisement by Sainsbury's. The remixed version from Thompson was then remixed again by DJ Felix Jaehn—as "Ain't Nobody (Loves Me Better)"—in 2015 and became a huge hit, peaking at number two in the UK, and charting in several other countries. Her voice has been described as "eerie", "soft", and "incandescent".

Early life 
Thompson was born on 8 November 2000 in London, to an English father and a Chinese mother. In 2017, Thompson opened up about the divorce of her parents, at an interview about Wonderland, which inspired her latest EP at that time. Thompson has an older brother Jed.

Career

2013: Bundle of Tantrums 
In July 2013, Thompson self-released a cover of Naughty Boy's single "La La La". In August, she released 3 different covers: a cover of Taylor Swift's "Everything Has Changed" (as a duet with Gerald Ko), a cover of Passenger's "Let Her Go", and a cover of David Guetta's "Titanium". In September the same year, she self-released her debut album Bundle of Tantrums, which included the singles "La La La", "Let Her Go", and "Titanium".

In September 2013, Thompson released a cover of Chaka Khan's "Ain't Nobody". The song featured in an advert for UK supermarket chain Sainsbury's for their by Sainsbury's range. The song has peaked at number thirty-two on the UK Singles Chart. In October 2013, she released the extended play Under the Willow Tree. One of the songs, named "Run", enjoyed moderate success in Europe and the United States.

2014: Another Bundle of Tantrums 
On 20 April 2014, Thompson released her second album, Another Bundle of Tantrums. The album peaked at number 126 on the UK Albums Chart. In September 2014, Thompson's cover of "Everybody Hurts" was used in the BBC autumn trailer for EastEnders. The trailer showed characters Kat Moon, Sharon Watts, and Linda Carter repeating Thompson's lyrics. Jasmine also released a cover of Clean Bandit's song "Rather Be" on 13 April 2014.

2015–2016: Adore EP 

On 12 June 2015, Thompson released her first single on Atlantic Records's label, entitled "Adore". Later that year, on 18 September, Thompson released her third extended play, Adore. It included 5 songs: "Adore", "Do It Now", "Great Escape", "Let Myself Try", and "Crystal Heart".

In 2015, German music producer and DJ Felix Jaehn released a remix of "Ain't Nobody", originally released by Thompson in 2013 titled "Ain't Nobody (Loves Me Better)". The song became a worldwide hit, topping the charts in Austria, Germany, Hungary, Israel, and the Netherlands, and peaking within the top ten of the charts in Belgium, Denmark, Finland, France, Romania, Sweden, and Switzerland.

In 2016, her cover of "Mad World" was used in the trailer for Ewan McGregor's film American Pastoral. In the same year, her cover of ″Mad World″ also was used in the French movie, Ares. It is played at the end of the movie leading to the credits.

2017: Wonderland EP 
On 19 May 2017, Thompson released her fourth extended play, Wonderland.

2019: Colour EP 
On 29 March 2019, Thompson released her fifth extended play, Colour.

2020: New music 
On 16 July 2020, Thompson collaborated with German DJ Zedd on the song "Funny".

Discography

Studio albums

Extended plays

Singles

As lead artist

As featured artist

Songwriting credits

References

External links 

 
 

2000 births
English women singer-songwriters
English child singers
English people of Chinese descent
Singers from London
Living people
Atlantic Records artists
English YouTubers
21st-century English women singers
21st-century English singers
Music YouTubers
YouTubers from London